René Donnio (29 August 1889 – 2 January 1934) was a French film actor.

Selected filmography
 Tillers of the Soil (1923)
 The Crew (1928)
 Cagliostro (1929)
 Fun in the Barracks (1932)
 Monsieur Albert (1932)
 Take Care of Amelie (1932)
 Under the Leather Helmet (1932)

References

Bibliography
 Goble, Alan. The Complete Index to Literary Sources in Film. Walter de Gruyter, 1999.

External links

1889 births
1934 deaths
French male film actors
French male silent film actors
20th-century French male actors
People from Loudéac